Godless may refer to:

 Godlessness, the absence of theism

Books
 Godless (Barker book), a 2008 book by Dan Barker
 Godless (novel), a 2004 young adult novel by Pete Hautman
 Godless: The Church of Liberalism, a 2006 book written by Ann Coulter

Film and television
 Godless (film), a 2016 Bulgarian drama film
 Godless: The Eastfield Exorcism, a 2023 Australian horror film
 Godless (TV series), a Netflix TV series released in 2017
 Godless, a 2011 documentary two-part miniseries directed by Craig Goodwill and Patricia Bush

Music
 "Godless" (song), a song by The Dandy Warhols
 "Godless", a song by U.P.O. from the 2000 album No Pleasantries
 Godless, an EP by Catalepsy